The 1947 NC State Wolfpack football team was an American football team that represented North Carolina State University as a member of the Southern Conference (SoCon) during the 1947 college football season. In its fourth season under head coach Beattie Feathers, the team compiled a 5–3–1 record (3–2–1 against SoCon opponents), outscored opponents by a total of 92 to 57, and was ranked No. 17 in the final AP Poll.

Schedule

References

NC State
NC State Wolfpack football seasons
NC State Wolfpack football